Khalid Siddiqui (born 1 February 1971) is a model, and film and television actor.

Siddiqui has worked in a number of television shows and Bollywood films. He had a supporting role in Ghajini. Recently he worked in "Shaurya aur Anokhi ki kahani" on StarPlus.

Career
Before entering in the industry, Siddiqui had worked in a number of television commercials for brands including ICICI Bank, Bombay Dyeing, Cadbury Perk, Suzuki Alto and Gillette. Siddiqui made his debut in a music video which was directed by Subhash Ghai. His screen appearance in the video gained him a parallel lead role in the film Joggers' Park (2003). Actor Victor Banerjee was impressed by his acting skills and offered him to play lead role in the film Ho Sakta Hai (2006), directed by Wilson Louis. Critic Taran Adarsh praised Siddiqui's performance in the film.

In 2007 he participated in the song "Mujhe Khabar Thi" from Lata Mangeshkar's music album Saadgi(2007) opposite Mona Singh, launched by T-Series.

Siddiqui also appeared in the films Apaharan (2005), The Film (2005), Ghajini (2008), Riwayat (2012), One Night Stand (2016),	Sargoshiyan	(2017) and Lahore Confidential (2021).

Siddiqui moved from films to television with the show Main Aisi Kyunn Hoon (2007). Further, he played Manav in the soap opera Na Bole Tum Na Maine Kuch Kaha (2012), where his character had a commercial angle between Megha (Aakanksha Singh) and Mohan (Kunal Karan Kapoor). In the same year, he played the roles of Tauseef Baig in the drama Tum Saath Ho Jab Apne (2014) where his character, being dead is seen in flashbacks, a superhero and his alter-ego journalist in Maharakshak: Aryan (2014) and as a mythological king in The Adventures of Hatim (2013). he has also played a role of Chief Minister in Ek Shringaar-Swabhiman. Khalid also appeared in Star Plus's most popular drama series Saath Nibhaana Saathiya as a protagonist, opposite Devoleena Bhattacharjee after the walk-out of the lead actor Mohammad Nazim, who was playing Ahem.

Personal life
Siddiqui was born and brought up in Mumbai Maharashtra. He was married to Raahat with whom he had a daughter, Ariana, born on 19 November 2003 and a son, Ilhaan, born on 1 September 2010. In 2013 the couple separated and in 2015 the couple were divorced.

Filmography

Films

Television

Web series

Footnotes

References

External links

Living people
Male actors in Hindi cinema
Indian male television actors
1971 births